Ongallur-I is a census town in the Palakkad district, state of Kerala, India.ongallur is a town. It forms a part of Ongallur gram panchayat.

Demographics
In the 2011 census, Ongallur-I had 16,998 people, of whom 8,310 were male and 8,688 female.

References

3 .https://www.citypopulation.de/php/india-kerala.php?adm2id=3206

Ongallur-I